Teteven is a town on the banks of the Vit river, at the foot of Stara Planina mountain in north central Bulgaria. It is the administrative centre of the Teteven Municipality which is a part of Lovech Province. As of December 2010, the town had a population of 10,733 inhabitants.

Geography
Teteven is located in a mountainous area, in the foothills of the Balkan mountains between the peaks Ostrich, Petrahilya, Cherven, Treskavets and Vezhen. The river Vit meanders through the town. The altitude of Teteven district varies from 340 to 2100 m, and in the town center it is 415 m. The climate is temperate continental with cold winters and cool summers.
The territory of Teteven is about 697 km², which is 16.86% of the territory of Lovech district.

History

The town was first mentioned in a written document in 1421. It is thought that the town's name comes from the family of a certain Tetyo (Tetyov rod), who settled in the area and founded the town. Older variants of the town's name found in documents are Tetyuven and Tetyuvene.

A thriving city in the 16th and 17th centuries, Teteven was raided by organised Turkish brigand groups in 1801, burnt down and almost completely destroyed, with only four houses surviving out of a total of 3,000. The town later revived and was active in the armed struggle for Bulgarian independence in the 19th century, sheltering a revolutionary committee part of Vasil Levski's organised rebel network.

Each summer a large chess tournament, one of the biggest events in Bulgaria's chess calendar, is held in Teteven.

Honour
Teteven Glacier on Livingston Island in the South Shetland Islands, Antarctica is named after Teteven.

Sights

Teteven combines the beauty of the surrounding scenery with the towering hills and peaks Petrahilya, Ostrich, Cherven and Ravni Kamak (they have witnessed many historical events), the cool breeze of the Vit river, and the spirit of centuries past, hovering in the multitude of monuments, ancient Bulgarian architecture, and customs and manners that have remained intact in time. Astounded by the sights revealed before him in his visit to the town, Ivan Vazov has exclaimed: "Had I not come to Teteven, I would have remained a foreigner to mother Bulgaria ... I have been wandering, I have been rambling, but I have not seen a more wondrous paradise."

There is a historical museum in Teteven, which is among the Hundred National Tourist Sites of the Bulgarian Tourist Union.

Sights of Teteven and the Teteven district

 Glozhen Monastery
 Saint Elijah Monastery (14th century)
 All Saints Church
 Kosnitza waterfall
 Mother of God Shroud Chapel on Ostrich peak
 Boev hill

Caves

 Saeva Dupka
 Morovitza
 Baiovitza
 Draganchovitza
 Rushova cave (near Gradezhnitza village)

Museums

 Teteven Historical Museum
 Bobevska house museum
 Hadzhiivanova house museum
 Yorgova house museum

Regular events

 Autumn fair
 Northern Song Feast (May)
 The Feast of Teteven on November 1, the day the town was liberated from Ottoman domination in 1877
 Days of Mountain Water and Healing Tourism, Scientific Research Center of Medical Biophysics, Teteven municipality, June 11

Gallery

Persons

Notable persons born in Teteven

Lyubomir Bobevski — writer 
Nikola Bobevski — artisan, elected Teteven delegate on the occasion of the signing of the San Stefano Peace Treaty 
Valentin Bobevski — conductor
Sabo Dimitrov — artist
Mihail Ekimdzhiev — lawyer 
Valentin Grozev (1950-2010) — artist 
Ignat Ignatov — professor, biophysicist
Usin Kerim — poet
Dimitar Krachidzhov — poet and publicist
Iva Krasteva — sports journalist, lives and works in London
Banyo Marinov (1853-1879) — revolutionary 
Nikola Merekiov — actor and agriculturalist 
Sava Mladenov — adherent of Vasil Levski and a revolutionary from Hristo Botev's armed group
Preslava Mravkova — singer (Music Idol)
Vera Naidenova — Bulgarian professor, film critic 
Svilen Rusinov — sportsman, honorary citizen of Teteven 
Hristo Spasunin (1923-2010) — poet and publicist 
Ivailo Stanev — photographer
Nikola Tiholov — scriptwriter 
Margarit Tzanev — artist 
Ivan Undzhiev (1902-1979) — Bulgarian professor-historian 
Nikolai Vitanov — professor, nuclear physicist
Hadji Stanyo Vrabevski — chairman of the local revolutionary committee, sent into exile in Diyarbakır

Notable persons who have died in Teteven

 Georgi Benkovski (1843-1876) — Bulgarian revolutionary
 Atanas Murdzhev (1875-1944) — Bulgarian revolutionary

See also
 Lovech
 Lukovit
 Petrevene

References

External links
 Teteven municipality portal (Bulgarian version)
 Teteven municipality portal (English version)
 Days of Mountain Water and Healing Tourism (English version) Teteven Municipality, Scientific Research Center of Medical Biophysics

Towns in Bulgaria
Populated places in Lovech Province